Khun Khong is a tambon (subdistrict) of Hang Dong District, in Chiang Mai Province, Thailand. In 2005 it had a population of 4772 people. The tambon contains 9 villages.

References

Tambon of Chiang Mai province
Populated places in Chiang Mai province